The  NLEX Road Warriors season was the seventh season of the franchise in the Philippine Basketball Association (PBA).

Key dates
March 14: The PBA Season 46 draft was held at the TV5 Media Center in Mandaluyong.

Draft picks

Special draft

Regular draft

Roster

Philippine Cup

Eliminations

Standings

Game log

|-bgcolor=ffcccc
| 1
| July 16
| Rain or Shine
| L 82–83
| Kiefer Ravena (23)
| Michael Miranda (8)
| Kiefer Ravena (7)
| Ynares Sports Arena
| 0–1
|-bgcolor=ccffcc
| 2
| July 18
| Barangay Ginebra
| W 94–75
| Kevin Alas (20)
| J. R. Quiñahan (10)
| Kiefer Ravena (5)
| Ynares Sports Arena
| 1–1
|-bgcolor=ffcccc
| 3
| July 23
| San Miguel
| L 93–110
| Kevin Alas (20)
| Raul Soyud (7)
| Kiefer Ravena (7)
| Ynares Sports Arena
| 1–2
|-bgcolor=ccffcc
| 4
| July 25
| Terrafirma
| W 108–94
| Kevin Alas (21)
| Raul Soyud (12)
| Kiefer Ravena (7)
| Ynares Sports Arena
| 2–2

|-bgcolor=ccffcc
| 5
| September 2
| Alaska
| W 84–74
| J. R. Quiñahan (18)
| Kevin Alas (7)
| Kevin Alas (3)
| DHVSU Gym
| 3–2
|-bgcolor=ccffcc
| 6
| September 4
| Phoenix
| W 94–76
| Jericho Cruz (19)
| Calvin Oftana (8)
| Jericho Cruz (8)
| DHVSU Gym
| 4–2
|-bgcolor=ffcccc
| 7
| September 8
| Magnolia
| L 105–112 (2OT)
| Jericho Cruz (21)
| Raul Soyud (16)
| Jericho Cruz (8)
| DHVSU Gym
| 4–3
|-bgcolor=ffcccc
| 8
| September 10
| TNT
| L 85–100
| Kevin Alas (16)
| Miranda, Soyud, Trollano (7)
| J. R. Quiñahan (5)
| DHVSU Gym
| 4–4
|-bgcolor=ffcccc
| 9
| September 12
| NorthPort
| L 94–96
| Don Trollano (19)
| Jericho Cruz (10)
| Alas, Cruz (6)
| DHVSU Gym
| 4–5
|-bgcolor=ccffcc
| 10
| September 16
| Blackwater
| W 90–73
| J. R. Quiñahan (16)
| Raul Soyud (11)
| Jericho Cruz (5)
| DHVSU Gym
| 5–5
|-bgcolor=ffcccc
| 11
| September 22
| Meralco
| L 101–104
| Calvin Oftana (34)
| Raul Soyud (12)
| Kevin Alas (5)
| DHVSU Gym
| 5–6

Playoffs

Bracket

Game log

|-bgcolor=ccffcc
| 1
| September 29
| Meralco
| W 81–80
| Anthony Semerad (23)
| Calvin Oftana (9)
| Calvin Oftana (5)
| DHVSU Gym
| 1–0
|-bgcolor=ffcccc
| 2
| October 1
| Meralco
| L 86–97
| Don Trollano (19)
| Calvin Oftana (11)
| Kevin Alas (4)
| DHVSU Gym
| 1–1

Governors' Cup

Eliminations

Standings

Game log

|-bgcolor=ccffcc
| 1
| December 8
| San Miguel
| W 114–102
| K. J. McDaniels (27)
| K. J. McDaniels (11)
| Kevin Alas (8)
| Ynares Sports Arena
| 1–0
|-bgcolor=ccffcc
| 2
| December 10
| NorthPort
| W 120–115 (OT)
| K. J. McDaniels (40)
| K. J. McDaniels (15)
| K. J. McDaniels (6)
| Ynares Sports Arena
| 2–0
|-bgcolor=ccffcc
| 3
| December 15
| TNT
| W 102–100
| K. J. McDaniels (33)
| K. J. McDaniels (8)
| Alas, Cruz (4)
| Smart Araneta Coliseum
| 3–0
|-bgcolor=ccffcc
| 4
| December 18
| Terrafirma
| W 116–86
| K. J. McDaniels (34)
| K. J. McDaniels (13)
| Paniamogan, Quiñahan (5)
| Smart Araneta Coliseum
| 4–0
|-bgcolor=ffcccc
| 5
| December 25
| Phoenix
| L 93–102
| Calvin Oftana (18)
| Calvin Oftana (11)
| Kevin Alas (7)
| Smart Araneta Coliseum4,843
| 4–1

|-bgcolor=ffcccc
| 6
| February 11, 2022
| Meralco
| L 100–110
| K. J. McDaniels (41)
| K. J. McDaniels (12)
| J. R. Quiñahan (5)
| Smart Araneta Coliseum
| 4–2
|-bgcolor=ffcccc
| 7
| February 16, 2022
| Magnolia
| L 109–112
| K. J. McDaniels (35)
| K. J. McDaniels (13)
| McDaniels, Trollano (3)
| Smart Araneta Coliseum
| 4–3
|-bgcolor=ccffcc
| 8
| February 18, 2022
| Blackwater
| W 117–97
| K. J. McDaniels (24)
| K. J. McDaniels (11)
| Don Trollano (6)
| Smart Araneta Coliseum
| 5–3
|-bgcolor=ccffcc
| 9
| February 23, 2022
| Alaska
| W 106–89
| K. J. McDaniels (27)
| K. J. McDaniels (11)
| Alas, Nieto (4)
| Ynares Center
| 6–3
|-bgcolor=ccffcc
| 10
| February 25, 2022
| Rain or Shine
| W 109–100 (OT)
| K. J. McDaniels (35)
| K. J. McDaniels (12)
| Kevin Alas (7)
| Ynares Center
| 7–3

|-bgcolor=ccffcc
| 11
| March 4, 2022
| Barangay Ginebra
| W 115–103
| K. J. McDaniels (26)
| Alas, McDaniels (10)
| Kevin Alas (8)
| Smart Araneta Coliseum
| 8–3

Playoffs

Bracket

Game log

|-bgcolor=ffcccc
| 1
| March 16, 2022
| Alaska
| L 79–93
| Cameron Clark (25)
| Cameron Clark (16)
| Kevin Alas (4)
| Smart Araneta Coliseum7,091
| 0–1
|-bgcolor=ccffcc
| 2
| March 19, 2022
| Alaska
| W 96–80
| Cameron Clark (24)
| Raul Soyud (9)
| Kevin Alas (4)
| Smart Araneta Coliseum10,486
| 1–1

|-bgcolor=ffcccc
| 1
| March 23, 2022
| Barangay Ginebra
| L 86–95
| Cameron Clark (30)
| Cameron Clark (13)
| Kevin Alas (5)
| SM Mall of Asia Arena
| 0–1
|-bgcolor=ffcccc
| 2
| March 25, 2022
| Barangay Ginebra
| L 94–104
| Matt Nieto (19)
| Don Trollano (6)
| Kevin Alas (5)
| SM Mall of Asia Arena
| 0–2
|-bgcolor=ccffcc
| 3
| March 27, 2022
| Barangay Ginebra
| W 86–85
| Cameron Clark (21)
| Cameron Clark (17)
| Alas, Clark (4)
| SM Mall of Asia Arena13,272
| 1–2
|-bgcolor=ffcccc
| 4
| March 30, 2022
| Barangay Ginebra
| L 94–104
| Cameron Clark (34)
| Cameron Clark (12)
| Kevin Alas (6)
| Smart Araneta Coliseum10,353
| 1–3

Transactions

Free agency

Signings

Trades

Pre-season

Mid-season

Recruited imports

References

NLEX Road Warriors seasons
NLEX Road Warriors